Libido is the first studio album by Peruvian rock band Líbido, released in 1998.

Release 
The launch of the album went unnoticed by the Peruvian audience at the time. However, with the launch of the singles, which sounded strong at major radio stations, the album became a success, which make known to achieving the group, began to appear in the main clubs of Lima, is as well as the group slowly gaining territory in the world of Peruvian music.

Track listing

Personnel 
Adapted from AllMusic.
Salim Vera – vocals
Saúl Cornejo – engineer
Fred Remmert – engineer
Jeffry Fischman – percussion, bateria
Inkeri Petrozzi – cello
Líbido – executive producers

References 

Líbido (band) albums
1998 albums